Teinoptera is a genus of moths of the family Noctuidae.

Species
Teinoptera culminifera Calberla, 1891
Teinoptera gafsana (Blachier, 1905)
Teinoptera lunaki Boursin, 1940
Teinoptera oliva Staudinger, 1895
Teinoptera olivina (Herrich-Schäffer, 1852)

References
Natural History Museum Lepidoptera genus database
Genus info and images

Calpinae